Cell lists (also sometimes referred to as cell linked-lists) is a data structure in molecular dynamics simulations to find all atom pairs within a given cut-off distance of each other. These pairs are needed to compute the short-range non-bonded interactions in a system, such as Van der Waals forces or the short-range part of the electrostatic interaction when using Ewald summation.

Algorithm

Cell lists work by subdividing the simulation domain into cells with an edge length greater than or equal to the cut-off radius of the interaction to be computed. The particles are sorted into these cells and the interactions are computed between particles in the same or neighbouring cells.

In its most basic form, the non-bonded interactions for a cut-off distance  are computed as follows:

for all neighbouring cell pairs  do
for all  do
for all  do

if  then
end if
end for
end for
end for

Since the cell length is at least  in all dimensions, no particles within  of each other can be missed.

The average number of particles per cell  therefore does not depend on the total number of particles. The number of cell pairs is proportional to the number of cells which is again proportional to the number of particles .

Periodic boundary conditions
In most simulations, periodic boundary conditions are used to avoid imposing artificial boundary conditions. Using cell lists, these boundaries can be implemented in two ways.

Ghost cells

In the ghost cells approach, the simulation box is wrapped in an additional layer of cells. These cells contain periodically wrapped copies of the corresponding simulation cells inside the domain.

Although the data—and usually also the computational cost—is doubled for interactions over the periodic boundary, this approach has the advantage of being straightforward to implement and very easy to parallelize, since cells will only interact with their geographical neighbours.

Periodic wrapping
Instead of creating ghost cells, cell pairs that interact over a periodic boundary can also use a periodic correction vector . This vector, which can be stored or computed for every cell pair , contains the correction which needs to be applied to "wrap" one cell around the domain to neighbour the other.

.

This approach, although more efficient than using ghost cells, is less straightforward to implement (the cell pairs need to be identified over the periodic boundaries and the vector  needs to be computed/stored).

Improvements

Consider a computational cell in three dimensions with edge length equal to the cut-off radius . The pairwise distance between all particles in the cell and in one of the neighbouring cells is computed. The cell has 26 neighbours: 6 sharing a common face, 12 sharing a common edge and 8 sharing a common corner. In other words, 84% of all pairwise distance computations are spurious.

This approach can be taken to the limit wherein each cell holds at most one single particle, therefore reducing the number of spurious pairwise distance evaluations to zero. This gain in efficiency, however, is quickly offset by the number of cells  that need to be inspected for every interaction with a cell , which, for example in three dimensions, grows cubically with the inverse of the cell edge length.

Another approach is outlined and tested in Gonnet, in which the particles are first sorted along the axis connecting the cell centers. This approach generates only about 40% spurious pairwise distance computations, yet carries an additional cost due to sorting the particles.

See also
 Verlet list

References

Molecular dynamics
Computational chemistry
Molecular physics
Computational physics
Numerical differential equations